Alonzo Hampton (born January 19, 1967) is a former American football defensive back. He played for the Minnesota Vikings in 1990 and for the Tampa Bay Buccaneers in 1991.

References

1967 births
Living people
People from Butler, Alabama
Players of American football from Alabama
American football defensive backs
Pittsburgh Panthers football players
Minnesota Vikings players
Tampa Bay Buccaneers players